Mocomoco or Muqu Muqu (Aymara) is one of five municipalities of the Eliodoro Camacho Province in the La Paz Department in Bolivia. Its seat is Mocomoco (Muqu Muqu).

Division 
The municipality is divided into five cantons:

References 

 www.ine.gov.bo / census 2001: Mocomoco Municipality

External links 
 Mocomoco Municipality: population data and map

Municipalities of La Paz Department (Bolivia)